Germantown is a village in Clinton County, Illinois, United States. The population was 1,324 at the 2020 census.

History
The village of Germantown was established in 1833. Formerly known as "Hanover" for the city in Germany that was the hometown of the first settlers, Germantown is said to be one of the first true German settlements in Illinois.

Geography
Illinois Route 161 runs along the southern border of the village, leading east  to Centralia and west  to New Baden.

Demographics

As of the 2020 census there were 1,324 people, 544 households, and 319 families residing in the village. The racial makeup of the village was 93.13% White, 0.23% African American, 0.38% Native American, 1.96% from other races, and 4.31% from two or more races. Hispanic or Latino of any race were 4.38% of the population.

There were 544 households, out of which 55.33% had children under the age of 18 living with them, 41.54% were married couples living together, 10.66% had a female householder with no husband present, and 41.36% were non-families. 32.35% of all households were made up of individuals, and 19.85% had someone living alone who was 65 years of age or older. The average household size was 3.04 and the average family size was 2.34.

The village's age distribution consisted of 23.5% under the age of 18, 8.4% from 18 to 24, 22.7% from 25 to 44, 27% from 45 to 64, and 18.4% who were 65 years of age or older. The median age was 41.1 years. For every 100 females, there were 99.2 males. For every 100 females age 18 and over, there were 98.4 males.

The median income for a household in the village was $61,364, and the median income for a family was $77,917. Males had a median income of $50,000 versus $32,130 for females. The per capita income for the village was $31,878. About 7.2% of families and 7.3% of the population were below the poverty line, including 9.0% of those under age 18 and 15.3% of those age 65 or over.

Notable people

 Red Schoendienst, second baseman and Major League Baseball Hall of Famer, born in Germantown

Schools 
Germantown Elementary provides classes for students in Pre-K up to eighth grade. The school has received several awards in past years for academic excellence. In addition, the school offers many extra-curricular activities, including: student council, scholar bowl, math team, science fair, team quest, concert band, jazz band, group and solo vocal performing, girls and boys track and field, girls and boys basketball, cheerleading, and girls volleyball.

There is no high school in Germantown, but there are two high schools in the neighboring town, Breese. Germantown is in the service area of Central Community High School, formed as a consolidation of the Breese and Aviston high schools in 1971. A private school in Breese in Mater Dei Catholic High School.

References

External links
Village of Germantown official website
Germantown Elementary School

Villages in Clinton County, Illinois
Villages in Illinois
Populated places established in 1833
German-American culture in Illinois
German communities in the United States
1833 establishments in Illinois